, the Seahawks' flagship stations are 710 KIRO-AM and 97.3 KIRO-FM. 710 AM is the only AM radio station the team has ever been affiliated with,  although it has been simulcast on various FM radio stations co-owned with KIRO. The current announcers are former Seahawks receiver Steve Raible (who was the team's color commentator from 1982–2003) and former Seahawks linebacker Dave Wyman. Pete Gross, who called the games from 1976 until just days before his death from cancer in 1992, is a member of the team's Ring of Honor. Games are heard on 46 stations in five states and Canada.

Past
Past announcers include: Steve Thomas (Radio: 1992–1997), Lee Hamilton also known as "Hacksaw" (Radio: 1998–1999), and Brian Davis (Radio: 2000–2003). Preseason games not shown on national networks are televised by Seattle's local Fox affiliate, KCPQ-TV channel 13. Curt Menefee is the current preseason voice of the Seahawks, while Brock Huard provides color commentary on preseason telecasts.

Radio broadcasters

References 

 
Seattle Seahawks
broadcasters